The 2015 BWF Grand Prix Gold and Grand Prix was the ninth season of the BWF Grand Prix Gold and Grand Prix.

Schedule
Below is the schedule released by Badminton World Federation:

Results

Winners

Performance by countries
Tabulated below are the Grand Prix performances based on countries. Only countries who have won a title are listed:

Grand Prix Gold

Malaysia Masters

Syed Modi International

German Open

Swiss Open

China Masters

New Zealand Open

U.S Open

Chinese Taipei Open

Thailand Open

Bitburger Open

Korea Masters

Macau Open

Indonesian Masters

Grand Prix

Canada Open

Russian Open

Vietnam Open

Dutch Open

Chinese Taipei Masters

Scottish Open

Brazil Open

U.S. Grand Prix

Mexico City

References

Grand Prix Gold and Grand Prix
BWF Grand Prix Gold and Grand Prix